Gaia Cornelia Supera (died after 253 AD) was the empress of Rome and the wife of Emperor Aemilian.

Nothing is known about her life, except from numismatic evidence. Her full name on the coins is C[AIA] CORNEL[IA] SVPERA AVG[VSTA], or alternatively CORNEL[IA] SVPERA AVG[VSTA] or COR[NELIA] SVPERA AV[GVSTA]. Her coins are extremely rare. Her name and monuments were condemned after Valerian was hailed as emperor in October of 253.

References

3rd-century Roman empresses
Crisis of the Third Century
Cornelii
Augustae